Security Forces Headquarters – West (SFHQ-W) is a regional command of the Sri Lanka Army, that is responsible for the operational deployment and command all army units stationed in the western part of the island, this includes two divisions. The current Commander SFHQ-W is Major General U A B Medawela. The SFHQ-W is based at Panagoda Cantonment.

Although it is primary a command of the Sri Lanka Army it coordinates operations and deployments of ground units of the Navy, Air Force and police with that of the army in that area. Security Forces Headquarters – West was formed spiting the Security Forces Headquarters – South which existed briefly.

Composition

14 Division, based in Colombo, Western Province (formerly Operation Command Colombo)
142 Brigade, based in Colombo and Kalutara
143 Brigade, based in Puttalam and Kurunegala
581 Brigade, based in Gampaha
58 Division
141 Brigade, based in Galle and Matara
583 Brigade, based in Ratnapura

References

Commands of the Sri Lanka Army
Military headquarters in Sri Lanka